City of Bones is the twelfth novel by American crime author Michael Connelly, and the eighth featuring the Los Angeles detective Hieronymus "Harry" Bosch. Published in 2002, it was named a Notable Book of the Year by the New York Times.

Plot summary
On New Year's Day, a dog digs up a bone in Laurel Canyon, Los Angeles. The dog's owner, a doctor, recognizes the bone as human and calls it in to the police. Hieronymus “Harry” Bosch takes on the case together with his colleague Jerry Edgar and after investigating the matter further, a shallow grave containing the bones of a child, is discovered. Bosch can't let go of the case, a case that brings back memories from his own childhood, and starts an investigation. The only clue that he has to go on is the skateboard found during a search at a suspect's house. The body turns out to have been a 12-year-old boy that has been buried 20 years earlier. To solve the murder, Bosch has to dig through records of cases involving disappearances and runaways dating far back in time. In order to try to solve the crime, Bosch has to chase down possible witnesses and suspects from near and far. After 20 years time, a lot of the details once remembered about the disappearance of the boy are blurred and leads Bosch fumbling in the dark. At the same time, a female rookie named Julia Brasher joins the department. Even though Bosch has been warned not to fall for a rookie, he does and this leads to further complications, both inside and outside of the investigation.

Television series 
All seven seasons of the Amazon Prime Video series, Bosch, are based on Connelly's books. The events of City of Bones, together with those of The Concrete Blonde and Echo Park, serve as the basis for the first season. The main plot of the discovered bones and Bosch's tumultuous relationship with Brasher feature heavily in the show.

References

Harry Bosch series
2002 American novels
Novels set in Los Angeles
Anthony Award-winning works
Barry Award-winning works
Little, Brown and Company books